The Brown Noser (also known as The Noser) is an undergraduate satirical newspaper at Brown University in Providence, Rhode Island.

History 
Founded in 2006, The Brown Noser is the university's second oldest humor publication (behind The Brown Jug, founded in 1920). When the Brown Nosers founders first applied to the Board of the Undergraduate Council of Students to request a financial endowment for publishing, they were denied funding. The founders then stormed the Undergraduate Council of Students meetings covered in body paint until they received funding sufficient to print the Noser five times a semester. The first article was "Brown Noser to Replace Daily Herald as Campus's Premier Comedy Newspaper", a joke on the Brown University's oldest publication, The Brown Daily Herald.

In Fall 2009, the Noser adopted and revived The Brown Jug, the student satirical magazine founded in 1920. The Jug features humorous content which mocks popular culture, fashion trends, politics, humorous illustrations, and events around the Brown University's campus. The Noser is part of a collective of Brown comedy groups, along with Improvidence, Starla and Sons, and The Brown Jug, known as the "Brown Barrel."

Issues 
The Brown Noser publishes five times per year and unloads hundreds of copies within hours of its release by stationing members at frequented campus intersections.

Notable alumni 
Ian Spector, humorist known for creating internet phenomenon "Chuck Norris facts"
Hugh Hewitt, contributor Washington Post

See also 
The Brown Jug
The Brown Daily Herald

References

Brown University organizations